The University of Western Ontario Faculty of Law, branded as Western Law since 2011, is the law school of Western University in London, Ontario, Canada. Founded in 1959, its first Dean was former Supreme Court of Canada justice, the Honourable Ivan Cleveland Rand, who saw the school as developing "in the minds of its students the habit of thinking in terms of the dynamic tradition, in the broadest sense, of our law." The current Dean of Law is Erika Chamberlain, former clerk to Supreme Court Justice John C. Major, who began her tenure in May 2017.

Facilities
The law school is situated in the southwest portion of Western's main campus and is housed in the Josephine Spencer Niblett building. While the school finds itself in the middle of the university's large campus, the law school is completely self-contained, offering students two lounges, a café, moot court room and library. The John and Dotsa Bitove Family Law Library, located on the second floor of the law school, is the central information resource for students and faculty members of the faculty.  The collection currently includes approximately 193,000 volumes and 45,000 microforms. Primary materials include a comprehensive collection of Canadian legislation and law reports, the principal British and American legal sources, and a growing collection of European and other international materials.  The library also has an excellent collection of legal treatises and periodical literature.

Admissions and academics

For the 2017 academic year, there were 2,152 applicants for the 173 first-year spaces. The mean entering grade was 84% (3.7 GPA) and the mean LSAT score was 162 (86th percentile).

The school also has exchange programs with law schools around the world. Upper year students have the opportunity to study abroad for one semester for credit to their Western J.D.

The faculty offers two masters-level degrees: the Master of Laws (LL.M.) and the Master of Studies in Law (M.S.L.). The Ph.D. program began in September 2013.

Western Law, in conjunction with other faculties on campus also offers joint degree programs, including combined business and law degrees, combined law and engineering degrees and combined law and Ph.D. degrees.

The 2009–10 academic year marked Western Law's 50th anniversary.

Centres and clinics
The law school houses a number of student-staffed legal centres and clinics, which provide services to different segments of the community, while providing law students with practical legal experience.

Pro Bono Students Canada

Pro Bono Students Canada is a national program that started a branch at the University of Western Ontario, Faculty of Law in the 1998–99 academic year. The function of the program is to match law student volunteers with community agencies with a need for legal services but with insufficient resources to compensate legal counsel. Agencies typically involved in Pro Bono Students Canada include public interest and non-profit organizations, tribunals, legal clinics and lawyers working pro bono on a particular case. Law student volunteers complete legal research or other law-related projects for member organizations over the course of the academic year under the supervision of a lawyer mentor. The Western program is one of the largest national chapters.

Community Legal Services

Community Legal Services (CLS) provides free legal advice and representation to members of the community, and to Fanshawe College and Western students. CLS is funded by Legal Aid Ontario, Fanshawe Student's Council, the University Students Council, and the Faculty of Law.

Over 100 students work at CLS over the course of the academic year under the supervision of three experienced lawyers.  Students carry their own files, and gain valuable experience in client correspondence, legal research and drafting of pleadings.  Students also have the opportunity to appear at court on behalf of CLS' clients, arguing motions, appearing in criminal court and conducting Small Claims Court trials. Further, students that take upper-year advanced litigation practice courses, also work at CLS for academic credit. John Eberhard Q.C. was a third-year law student when he persuaded the dean and faculty members to allow him to create and coordinate Western’s (UWO) first “Student Defenders System”, the precursor of CLS.

Dispute Resolution Centre

The Dispute Resolution Centre (DRC) is a not-for-profit organization that provides mediation services to residents of London and Middlesex County who wish to resolve their disputes quickly, efficiently and inexpensively.

Operated by Western Law students under the supervision the Faculty at the University of Western Ontario, the DRC can help develop solutions to conflict in an organized and informal way.  The DRC mediates disputes in varied types of conflicts, such as landlord/tenant, consumer/merchant, interpersonal/relationship, private contract and separation disputes.

Sport Solution

The Sport Solution is a joint project of Athletes CAN and the Dispute Resolution Centre at Western Law.  The program is nationally available and provides assistance in resolving sport-related problems and offers support throughout the dispute resolution process.

Business Law Clinic

The Western Business Law Clinic provides small or start-up businesses with legal representation on transaction matters including business structure, finance, intellectual property protection, product liability, employment law, government regulations, contracts, taxation, guarantees and personal liability and environmental issues.

Publications
The school publishes two law journals: the faculty-edited Canadian Journal of Law and Jurisprudence, and the student-edited University of Western Ontario Journal of Legal Studies.  The school also has a student newspaper, Amicus Curiae.

Student life
The law school is home to many student-run clubs, including a student newspaper called Amicus Curiae and various interest-based clubs.  The main student governing body of Western Law is the Student Legal Society (SLS) who oversees numerous clubs including:

 Aboriginal Law Club
 Black Law Student Association
 Business Law Society
 Canadian Lawyers for International Human Rights
 Christian Legal Fellowship
 Criminal Law Students Association (CLSA)
 East Asian Law Students Federation
 Entertainment and Sports Law Association
 First Generation Network – Western Law Chapter 
 Gender and the Law Association (GALA)
 Health Law Club
 International Law Association (ILA)
 Italian Student Law Society (ISLS)
 Jewish Law Students' Association
 Labour and Employment Law Society
 Legal Ethics Student Association
 Mature Students Club
 OutLaw Western
 Phi Delta Phi
 South Asian Law Students Association (SALSA)
 Student Environmental Law Association
 Western Intellectual Property Association
 Western Law Advocacy Club
 Western Law French Society
 Western Law Karaoke Club
 Western Law Review Association
 Women in the Law

Approximately every other Wednesday during the academic year, the SLS organizes social outings for law students at large bars or night clubs. Known as "Dennings", they are named after Alfred Denning, the judge from England's Court of Appeal.  A few hours before each Denning, the Mature Students Club hosts "Puisne Dennings" at a nearby pub geared towards more conversation and discourse.

The law building houses a student lounge. A Starbucks operates in the part of the law building known as "Chambers". Law students also have access to all the amenities of the larger university campus.

Western Law students participate in many intramural sports, competing with other faculty and residence based teams on campus.  Students also participate in the yearly "Law Games" against teams from other law schools across Canada. Western organized the 2007 edition of these games.

See also
List of law schools in Canada

References

Western Law
Western Ontario
1959 establishments in Ontario

fr:Université de Western Ontario
ja:ウェスタンオンタリオ大学
pl:Uniwersytet Zachodniego Ontario
zh:西安大略大学